Hans Christian Tomas Alfredson (born 1 April 1965) is a Swedish film director who is best known internationally for directing the 2008 vampire film Let the Right One In and 2011 espionage film Tinker Tailor Soldier Spy. Alfredson has received the Guldbagge award for Best Direction twice; in 2005 for Four Shades of Brown, and in 2008 for Let the Right One In.

He is the son of director and actor Hans Alfredson and the brother of director Daniel Alfredson.

Early life
Alfredson was born in 1965 in Lidingö, Stockholms län, Sweden, the son of Gunilla and comedian, writer, and director Hans "Hasse" Alfredson. Tomas was used to being treated differently from an early age. "[A small] number of people were public property, and he was one of them," Alfredson said of his father. Hasse was seldom home, and Tomas was mostly raised by his mother. "But I participated in [Hasse's] film productions every summer, it was probably a way for us to reach each other (...) I thought it was great fun."

Alfredson would often have minor roles in the Hasseåtage series of popular films, that featured the comedy-duo of his father and Tage Danielsson – such as the role of the "Count" in The Apple War (1971), his sole line of dialogue being "Adieu, mon plaisir" ("Goodbye, my pleasure").

Directing career
Alfredson's career started at Svensk Filmindustri, where he worked as an assistant. He was involved in the creation of the Swedish television channel TV4, where he worked in the entertainment department. One of his successes was the Swedish adaptation of Fort Boyard, "Fångarna på Fortet". Alfredson then moved on to Sveriges Television, creating television series such as Ikas TV-kalas, a children's television show starring Ika Nord, who would later appear in Alfredson's 2008 film Let the Right One In. According to Nord, Alfredson was "only 25, but already extremely knowledgeable". In 1994 Alfredson directed Bert, another tv production based on the Bert diaries, a popular series of teenage novels written in the diary form. A feature film, Bert: The Last Virgin, based on the series was made in 1995, for which Alfredson received a Guldbagge nomination for Best Direction.

Alfredson joined the Swedish comedy group Killinggänget as a director in 1999. "I saw that they were a little funnier than the others, and a little more thorough", he said. His first collaboration with the group was a 1999 series of four television films, including the mockumentary Screwed in Tallinn, which depicts a group of Swedish bachelors who travel to Estonia by bus in the hopes of finding Estonian girlfriends. The 2004 film Four Shades of Brown, directed by Alfredson, is Killinggänget's only feature film to date. The film intertwines four unrelated stories with a common theme of betrayal, in particular parents betraying their children. The film received four Guldbagge awards, including Best Direction for Alfredson.

Swedish author John Ajvide Lindqvist released his debut horror novel Let the Right One In in 2004. After reading the novel, Alfredson wanted to get involved in a film adaptation, and approached Lindqvist: "They was a crowd banging on his door to make a movie, so I was #40 or something. When we met, he knew of me and he liked what I'd done previously, and we got along together very well." The film tells the story of a 12-year-old bullied boy who befriends a child vampire in early 1980s Blackeberg, Sweden. In addition to directing, Alfredson edited the film in collaboration with Dino Jonsäter.

Let the Right One In premiered on 26 January 2008 at the Göteborg International Film Festival, where Alfredson won the Festival's Nordic Film Prize. The film went on to win additional awards, including the Founders Award for Best Narrative Feature at the Tribeca Film Festival. The film quickly became an international success, with the rights being sold to more than forty countries before its theatrical release on 24 October 2008. Domestically, the film won five Guldbagge Awards, with Alfredson receiving his second Guldbagge Award for Best Direction.

International career
After finishing the work on Let the Right One In, Alfredson publicly announced that he would not make any more films in the "foreseeable future". He stated that he had grown tired with the Swedish film and television industry, which he considered "drained of power, courage, and gravity." While he had received several offers from Hollywood producers, he was reluctant to leave his "home, children and all the colleagues I depend on to be good." However, in March 2009 he announced that he would partake in a big international film production. In July 2009, Alfredson signed to direct a film adaptation of John le Carré's 1974 novel Tinker Tailor Soldier Spy. Produced by Working Title Films' Tim Bevan and Eric Fellner, it premiered in September 2011 at the 68th Venice International Film Festival.

In 2012, it was announced that Alfredson had acquired the rights to make a film adaptation of Astrid Lindgren's novel The Brothers Lionheart, with Alfredson planning to direct and John Ajvide Lindqvist to write the screenplay.

In 2017, Alfredson directed the widely panned The Snowman.  Despite the all-star cast and popular book series by Jo Nesbø, the movie was derided by critics and received a 7% rating on Rotten Tomatoes.

Personal life
Alfredson is the brother of film director Daniel Alfredson. He has two children with his ex-wife Cissi Elwin Frenkel, who was managing director of the Swedish Film Institute. He resides in Stockholm.

Filmography

References

External links

1965 births
Living people
People from Lidingö Municipality
Swedish film directors
Best Director Guldbagge Award winners
Horror film directors